Salt is a 1996 novel by Trinidadian author Earl Lovelace. It won the 1997 Commonwealth Writers' Prize.

Plot

Alford George, son of a poor farm labourer on Trinidad, does not speak until the age of six, and grows up as an outsider; later he becomes a teacher and then a politician, and dreams of leaving his homeland for Great Britain. His ancestor, Guinea John, led an 1805 slave rebellion and then apparently flew back to Africa; the other slaves had eaten too much salt and could not fly with him.

Reception
In The Times, a reviewer said, "As to Lovelace's language, he is in a world of his own. It is a carnival of Creole sounds, and this is the deepest ideology of the novel, the display of the power of West Indian speech, the emancipation of the West Indian tongue from the shackles of the English sentence."

The Publishers Weekly review noted: "Using language that's as lush as the foliage of Trinidad and dialogue as vivid as the Caribbean, Lovelace creates a parable that applies to any nation struggling with unresolved racial issues and to any people struggling to free themselves from their past." 

In 1997, Salt was awarded the Commonwealth Writers' Prize (Overall Winner, Best Book), and was shortlisted for the 1998 International Dublin Literary Award.

In 2022, Salt was included on the Big Jubilee Read, a list of 70 books by Commonwealth authors produced to celebrate Queen Elizabeth II's Platinum Jubilee. The official site said that Salt "is an extraordinary tour de force by one of the pre-eminent literary presences in the Caribbean, a work which explores like none before it the intermingling of cultures that is the contemporary West Indian experience. The novel blends historical and social detail with political didacticism, but never loses Lovelace's humour or his painterly boldness with language."

References

1996 novels
Novels by Earl Lovelace
Novels set in Trinidad and Tobago
Novels about race and ethnicity
Novels about slavery
African diaspora literature
Trinidad and Tobago novels
Faber and Faber books